Musa bey Rafiyev Haji Mammadhuseyn oglu (1888–1938), also known as Musa bey Rafibeyli, was an Azerbaijani statesman who served as Special Minister in care of Social Security and Refugee Affairs in the second cabinet, Minister of Social Security and Healthcare in the fourth cabinet of Azerbaijan Democratic Republic, and was member of Azerbaijani National Council and later Parliament of Azerbaijan.

Early years
Rafiyev was born in Ganja, Azerbaijan in 1888. Son of local philanthropist Haji Mammadhuseyn Rafiyev, he received his elementary education at the madrasah of Shah Abbas Mosque and then at Ganja Classic Gymnasium. Musa Rafiyev had 6 brothers and 5 sisters. In 1911, he graduated from the Medical Department of Kharkov State University and returned to Ganja to start his medical practice. For exceptional services, he received several awards, among them Exemplar Council (1913), College Assessor (1914), Saray Council (1916). In 1914, in cooperation with Khudadat Rafibeyli and Hasan bey Aghayev, he co-founded the first Medical Society of Elisabethpol.

Political career
After the February Revolution in Russia, he was appointed representative of Special Transcaucasian Committee in Elisabethpol (Ganja). Having joined Musavat party, he became a member of Muslim faction of Transcaucasian Sejm and after its abolishment, a member of Azerbaijani National Council. Azerbaijan Democratic Republic was established on May 28, 1918. When its second government convened on June 17, 1918, Rafiyev was appointed a Special Minister without portfolio, in charge of Social Security and Refugee Affairs and served in the capacity until October 6, 1918. On October 6, 1918 the government of ADR moved to Baku and conducted administrative reforms. He was then appointed Minister of Social Security and Religious Affairs. He served held the office until December 7, 1918. On December 7, 1918 he was elected member of National Assembly of Azerbaijan from Musavat faction. When the fifth coalition government led by Nasib Yusifbeyli formed on December 24, 1919, Rafiyev was appointed Minister of Healthcare and Social Security.
 
After takeover of Azerbaijan by Bolsheviks on April 28, 1920 Rafiyev immigrated to Tabriz where he started a clinic and worked as a doctor until his death in 1938.

See also
Azerbaijani National Council
Cabinets of Azerbaijan Democratic Republic (1918-1920)
Current Cabinet of Azerbaijan Republic

References

1888 births
1938 deaths
Azerbaijan Democratic Republic politicians
Government ministers of Azerbaijan
Politicians from Ganja, Azerbaijan
Azerbaijani emigrants to Iran
National University of Kharkiv alumni
Azerbaijani physicians